is a Japanese manga series by Osamu Kashiwara about Mino ware pottery, set in the Tajimi city of Gifu Prefecture. It has been serialized online by Planet since February 2012, and has been collected in thirty-three digital volumes. A second manga series also by Kashiwara has been serialized online via Akita Shoten's Manga Cross website since January 2021. It has been collected in a single tankōbon volume. An anime television series adaptation by Nippon Animation aired from April to June 2021, and a second season aired from October to December 2021.

Characters

Media

Anime
An anime television series adaptation was announced via Twitter on February 14, 2020. The series was animated by Nippon Animation and directed by Jun Kamiya, with Naruhisa Arakawa handling series composition, and Ayano Yoshioka designing the characters. Tajimi and its tourism association collaborated on the anime. The series aired from April 3 to June 21, 2021 on CBC and other channels. Minami Tanaka, Yu Serizawa, Yūki Wakai, and Rina Honnizumi performed the opening theme song "Tobira o Aketara", while Aya Uchida performed the ending theme song "Pale Blue." Crunchyroll licensed the series.

On June 21, 2021, a second season, titled Let's Make a Mug Too: Second Kiln, was announced, with the main staff and cast members returning to reprise their roles. It aired from October 2 to December 18, 2021. The Mug-Mo unit (Minami Tanaka, Yu Serizawa, Yūki Wakai, and Rina Honnizumi) performed the opening theme song "Muchū no Saki e", while Aya Uchida performed the ending theme song "Yellow Canary".

Episode list

Let's Make a Mug Too

Let's Make a Mug Too: Second Kiln

Notes

References

External links
  
  
 

2021 anime television series debuts
Akita Shoten manga
Anime series based on manga
Art in anime and manga
Crunchyroll anime
Japanese webcomics
Medialink
Nippon Animation
School life in anime and manga
Shōnen manga
Television shows based on Japanese webcomics
Television shows set in Gifu Prefecture
Webcomics in print